Taawdo the Sunlight is a Rajasthani film released to theaters on 31 March 2017. The film features Preeti Jhangiani, Pradeep Kabra, Omkar Das Manikpuri and Sachin Choudhary and was written and directed by Vijay Suthar. The film was screened at Rajasthan International Film Festival in January 2017 and received three awards including Best Actress for Preeti Jhangiani and Best Music for Lalit Pandit. It was also screened at Masala Chawk in association with JDA and RIFF Club on 15 July 2018.

Plot
After two children (Sachin Choudhary and Taifur Gujrati) belonging to an Indian upper caste are lost in the desert, a lower cast woman Preeti Jhangiani spots them. However, she is torn between a mother's heart that aches to save the children and norms of the society that forbid her to form any relationship with the upper caste.

Starcast
 Preeti Jhangiani
 Pradeep Kabra
 Satyendra Singh Naruka
 Omkar Das Manikpuri
 sachin Choudhary
 Taifur Gujrati
 Shilpa Kularia
 Vijay Suthar
 Santosh Saini

Soundtracks

References

External links
 
 https://in.bookmyshow.com/honnavara/movies/taawdo-the-sunlight/ET00055413

2017 films
Rajasthani-language films